The Vanishing Adolescent is a 1959 book-length essay by Edgar Z. Friedenberg that describes changes American youth's sociological experience of adolescence. The volume was reprinted ten times and translated into multiple languages.

References

References

External links 

 

1959 non-fiction books
American non-fiction books
Beacon Press books
Books about the sociology of education
English-language books
Sociology books